Wanchope is a surname. Notable people with the surname include:

The Wanchope family, a prominent family in Costa Rican football:
 Vicente Wanchope (born 1946), Costa Rican footballer, or his sons:
 Javier Wanchope (born 1968), Costa Rican footballer
 Carlos Wanchope (born 1971), Costa Rican international footballer
 Paulo Wanchope (born 1976), Costa Rican footballer
 Carlos Watson (born 1951), Costa Rican footballer and brother of Vicente Wanchope
 Ramón Ábila (born 1989), Argentine footballer nicknamed "Wanchope"

References